Instruments used specially in radiology are as follows:

Image gallery

References

Medical physics
Medical imaging
Medical equipment